Clements is an English surname. Notable people with the surname include: 

Alex Clements, Canadian-Born Trainee Solicitor
Andrew Clements, author
Andrew Jackson Clements, politician
Bill Clements, politician
Billy Clements, rugby league footballer of the 1920s
Charlie Clements, British actor
Chuck Clements, American football player
Dave Clements, North Irish football player
Earle C. Clements, Kentucky politician and governor
Frederic Clements, ecologist
George Clements, American Roman Catholic priest
Harry Clements (footballer), English footballer
James Clements, ornithologist
Jeremy Clements, NASCAR driver
Joe Clements, actor
John Clements (disambiguation), multiple people
Jonathan Clements, British author
Kenny Clements, English football defender
Kyle Clements, Owner of RatzSportz
Logan Clements, California businessman and politician
Mark Alwin Clements, Australian botanist
Marie Clements, Canadian Métis playwright, performer, and director
Nate Clements (born 1979), American NFL cornerback
Nathaniel Clements, Irish politician
Nick Clements, linguist and phonologist
Richard Clements (painter)
Richard Clements (journalist)
Rita Crocker Clements, First Lady of Texas; married to Bill Clements
Robert George Clements, physician and suspected serial killer
Ron Clements, American animation director
Roy Clements, author
Sasha Clements (born 1990), Canadian actress and model
Shane Clements (1958–2001), Australian cricketer
Stan Clements, football player
Stanley Clements, actor
Sylvester G. Clements, American politician
TC Clements, American politician
Tom Clements (disambiguation), multiple people
Vassar Clements (1928–2005), American fiddle player
 William L. Clements (1861-1934), collector of historical works and benefactor to the University of Michigan

English-language surnames